Dennis Tyron James (born May 31, 1966) is a German-American retired IFBB Pro bodybuilder.

Early life
James was born in Heidelberg on May 31, 1966, the son of an African-American GI stationed in Heidelberg and a German woman. He started training in bodybuilding when he was 18 years old.

Stats (2012)
Height: 172 cm
Legs: 89 cm

Career
James won the International South German Championship in 1985, the International German Grand Prix in 1986, and the 1986 New York State Championship All Junior Category. He stopped training because he was not eligible to join the German Nationals since he did not hold German citizenship but made a comeback in 1990 after he left Germany.

The first National Physique Committee (NPC) competition of James was the NPC Junior USA of 1996, where he placed 13th. In 1999, he competed in his first Night of Champions, where he tied 14th. The following year, in 2000, he competed in his first Arnold Classic, placing 4th.

His first Mr. Olympia was in 2000 as well, where he placed 11th. He has competed in a total of seven Mr. Olympias, with his highest placing coming in 4th in 2003.

In 2010, James said that the 2010 Mr. Olympia would be his last competition. He also said that he had lied about his age in the past and that he will be "45 years old soon".

He announced the end of his competitive career in 2012. He has continued to train and mentor other bodybuilders.

Competition appearances 

1993 NABBA Mr. Universe, Medium-Tall, 4th
1994 NABBA Mr. Universe, Medium-Tall, 2nd
1995 NABBA Mr. Universe, Medium-Tall, 1st
1996 NPC Junior USA, Light-HeavyWeight, 13th
1996 NABBA Universe - Pro, 2nd
1997 NPC Junior Nationals, Light-HeavyWeight, 6th
1997 NPC Nationals, HeavyWeight, 4th
1998 NPC USA Championships, Super-HeavyWeight, 1st and Overall
1999 Night of Champions, 15th
2000 Arnold Classic, 4th
2000 Grand Prix England, 3rd
2000 Grand Prix Hungary, 3rd
2000 Ironman Pro Invitational, 7th
2000 Mr. Olympia, 11th
2000 World Pro Championships, 4th
2001 Arnold Classic, 3rd
2001 Grand Prix Australia, 2nd
2001 Grand Prix England, 3rd
2001 Grand Prix Hungary, 1st
2001 Mr. Olympia, 7th
2002 Arnold Classic, 7th
2002 Grand Prix England, 2nd
2002 Grand Prix Holland, 4th
2002 Mr. Olympia, 10th
2002 Show of Strength Pro Championship, 5th
2003 Mr. Olympia, 4th
2003 Show of Strength Pro Championship, 4th
2004 Mr. Olympia, 8th
2005 Charlotte Pro Championships, 2nd
2005 Mr. Olympia, 6th
2006 New York Pro Championships, 3rd
2006 Mr. Olympia, 9th
2006 Grand Prix Austria, 4th
2007 New York Pro, 2nd
2007 Colorado Pro Championships, 8th
2008 IFBB Tampa Bay Pro, 2nd
2008 IFBB Europa Super Show, 2nd
2009 IFBB Arnold Classic, 7th
2009 IFBB New York Pro Show, 2nd
2009 IFBB Tampa Pro, 1st
2009 Europa Super Show, 1st
2010 Mr. Olympia 11th
2012 Masters Mr. Olympia 3rd

References

External links
Dennis James' Website

1969 births
Living people
African-American bodybuilders
Professional bodybuilders
Sportspeople from Heidelberg
German emigrants to the United States
21st-century African-American people
20th-century African-American sportspeople